The  de Montesquiou family  is an old French noble family from Montesquiou in Gascony whose documented filiation traces back to circa 1190. In the 18th Century, the family was recognized as coming in the 11th century from the Counts of Fezensac (extinct in the 12th Century). The Montesquiou family split  into several branches, of which only the d'Artagnan  branch now remains.

Origins 
The first ancestor of proven genealogy is Raimond-Aimeri de Montesquiou, crossed knight around 1190.

In the proceedings of the cartulary of Auch (copies from the 13th Century), Raymond-Aimeri, first baron of Montesquiou is described around 1096 as the younger brother of Guillaume Astanove Count of Fezensac.

In 1777, the Montesquiou family was recognized as descending from the counts of Fezensac and Louis XVI allowed them to change their name to "de Montesquiou-Fezensac".

The Montesquiou illustrated themselves in the Third Crusade, the French war of religions, and as commanders of the musketeers. The Montesquiou family produced one field marshal (and two in the de Montluc family with which the link as a branch is contested by some author), one admiral, one cardinal, one archbishop, several generals, bishops, diplomats and one minister.

In 2011 certain members of the d'Artagnan branch changed their name to de Montesquiou-Fezesensac d'Artagnan.

The famous d'Artagnan, who inspired the Three Musketeers novel, was not a member of this family, but a member of  the de Batz de Castelmore family and his mother was a Montesquiou.

Titles 
Titles of the now extinct Marsan line:

 Baron of the Empire (1809)
 Count of Montesquiou (1817))
 Duke of Fezensac in 1821 and 1832. The title died out in 1913 with Philippe André, third duke of Fezensac)

Titles of the d'Artagnan line:
Count of the Empire (1809 and 1810) 
Baron of the Empire (1809 and 1810) 
Baron-pair (1824)

Notable members
 Bernard de Montesquiou (+1175) Bishop of Tarbes;
 Raymond-Aimeri de Montesquiou (fl. 1190), participant in the Third Crusade, first ancestor of proven parentage
 Pierre Cardinal de Montesquiou (+1262), Cardinal of Albi;
 Pictavin Cardinal de Montesquiou (+1355/6), Bishop of Albi;
 Pierre de Montesquiou d'Artagnan, (1645–1725), musketeer and maréchal de France;
 Henri Jacques de Montesquiou de Puylobon (1710–1777), Bishop of Sarlat;
 Anne-Pierre de Montesquiou-Fézensac (1739–1798), general and politician, member of the French Academy, he joined the Third Estate during the French Revolution;
 François-Xavier-Marc-Antoine de Montesquiou-Fézensac (1756–1832), duke, French politician;
 Raymond Aymeric Philippe Joseph de Montesquiou-Fezenzac, French soldier;
 Anatole de Montesquiou-Fezenzac (born in 1788), French soldier ;
 Bertrand de Montesquiou-Fézenzac (1837–1902), French admiral;
 Robert de Montesquiou (1855–1921), writer, poet, art collector;
 Léon de Montesquiou (1873–1915), essayist, French monarchist;
 Mathilde de Montesquiou-Fézenzac (1884–1960), wife of the composer Charles-Marie Widor;
 Aymeri de Montesquiou, contemporary French politician;
 Alfred de Montesquiou, contemporary French journalist;

References